Jack Driessen (born 11 July 1980 in Roermond, Netherlands) is a Dutch keyboardist, songwriter and arranger. He is co-founder and former member of the Dutch symphonic death metal band MaYaN. Furthermore he is known as the first keyboardist of the symphonic metal band After Forever (1995–2000) and as songwriter on 3 albums of the symphonic metal band Epica.

Discography

After Forever
Ephemeral (demo, 1999)
Wings of Illusion (demo, 1999)
Prison of Desire (2000)
Follow in the Cry (2000)
Mea Culpa (compilation, 2006)

Epica
Design Your Universe (2009)
Requiem for the Indifferent (2012)
The Quantum Enigma (2014)

MaYaN
Quarterpast (2011)
Antagonise (2014)
Undercurrent (EP, 2018)
Dhyana (2018)

References

External links
Profile at the official MaYaN website

1980 births
Living people
21st-century composers
People from Swalmen
Heavy metal keyboardists
Rock keyboardists
Progressive rock pianists
Dutch electronic musicians
Dutch heavy metal keyboardists
Dutch keyboardists
Dutch pianists
Dutch songwriters
Dutch composers
Dutch singer-songwriters
After Forever members
21st-century Dutch singers
21st-century pianists
Mayan (band) members